Lautari may refer to:

 Lăutari, Romanian Romani musicians
 Lautari, Croatia, a village near Čabar